Mazatlania cosentini, common name the false auger, is a species of sea snail, a marine gastropod mollusk in the family Columbellidae, the dove snails.

Description
The length of the shell varies between 6 mm and 24 mm.

The elongated shell is narrow and turreted. It is formed of nine or ten very distinct whorls, slightly convex, ornamented with a great number of ribs formed like folds, subnodulous, approximate, numerous, and slightly raised upon the lowest whorl. These ribs are apparent only at the upper part, whilst the base is provided with transverse striae, easily distinguished. The aperture is ovate, and strongly notched. The thin outer lip is sharp and rounded at the lower extremity. The columella is a little bent. The general color is of a yellowish white, ornamented with ferruginous, minute lines, and with a surrounding band of a bluish brown, below each suture. The body whorl presents, towards its base, another larger and deeper colored band, which is obvious within the aperture.

Distribution
This species occurs in the Caribbean Sea.

References

 Bouchet P. & Gofas S. (1983). "Terebra" cosentini Philippi, 1836 an American columbellid species. The Nautilus 97 (1): 26–28

External links
 Calcara, P. (1845). Cenno sui molluschi viventi e fossili della Sicilia da servire da supplimento ed insieme di critiche osservazioni all'opera di R.A. Philippi. Stamperia Reale, Palermo, 65 pp., pl. 1-4

Columbellidae
Gastropods described in 1836